The December 2016 Aden suicide bombings were terrorist attacks that occurred on 10 December and 18 December 2016 targeted on Yemeni soldiers in Aden, the responsibility of bombing was claimed by Islamic State of Iraq and the Levant group, according to Amaq news agency. The suicide bombing occurred in a gathering of soldiers who were to receive their salaries on 10 December 2016. The blasts took place at same military base camps on 18 December 2016.

Bombings

10 December 2016 bombing
At least 48 Yemeni soldiers were killed and another 29 were injured in a suicide bombing attack in Aden on 10 December. The Islamic State of Iraq and the Levant in Yemen claimed responsibility for the attack.

18 December 2016 bombing 

A second, similar, suicide bombing occurred eight days later on 18 December. At least 52 soldiers were killed and more than 60 others were injured. The suicide bomber was identified as Abu Hashim al-Radfani who had detonated the explosive vest amid gathering of soldiers. The statement was claimed and posted via Amaq news agency. The agency had posted pictures of the attack, and one showing young man wearing a white vest standing next to the black and white Islamic State flag.

See also
List of Islamist terrorist attacks 
List of terrorist incidents in December 2016
List of terrorist incidents linked to ISIL
Number of terrorist incidents by country
Timeline of ISIL-related events (2016)

References

2016 murders in Yemen
Suicide bombings in 2016
ISIL terrorist incidents in Yemen
Mass murder in 2016
Terrorist incidents in Aden
Terrorist incidents in Yemen in 2016
Yemeni Civil War (2014–present)
Islamic terrorist incidents in 2016
December 2016 crimes in Asia
Murder in Yemen
21st century in Aden
Suicide bombings in Yemen